Hot Tub is a weekly variety show hosted by Kurt Braunohler and Kristen Schaal. The show features a mix of alternative comedy from unknown performers to more established comedians. In 2005, Hot Tub was voted “Best Variety Show” by Time-Out New York’s reader poll and has quickly become one of L.A.’s most popular live comedy events. During the first seven years the show saw considerable success at Littlefied's in Brooklyn, New York. In 2013, under the helm of The Super Serious Show producers CleftClips, Hot Tub relocated to the West Coast at The Virgil in Silver Lake, Los Angeles.

Style 

Hot Tub harbors comedy acts that are unusual, odd, experimental, and generally free-wheeling. The show is also a venue in which well-known comedians try out new material and more eccentric bits. There is a great deal of improv, absurd performance art, and audience interaction in many performances. Much of Braunohler and Schaal’s material is fostered by the chemistry that developed from their friendship and extensive professional relationship.

Notable performers 

 Aziz Ansari
 Eugene Mirman
 Janeane Garofalo
 Kristen Schaal
 Kurt Braunohler
 Reggie Watts
 John Hodgeman 
 Dan Ilic 
 T.J. Miller
 Dan St. Germain
 Demetri Martin
 Patton Oswalt
 Kevin Meaney

References

External links
 Hot Tub with Kurt & Kristen
 CleftClips

Variety shows